Sokol Neziri (born 30 June 1996) is an Albanian footballer who plays as a defender for Flamurtari in the Kategoria e parë.

Career

Kastrioti
A graduate of the club's youth academy, Neziri made his Albanian Superliga debut on 10 May 2014, playing the entirety of a 3-1 defeat to Flamurtari.

References

External links

1996 births
Living people
KS Kastrioti players
Kategoria Superiore players
Kategoria e Parë players
Albanian footballers
Association football defenders